The Sultan ul Madaris ; is a Shia Islamic Madrasa (religious school) for higher religious education in Lucknow, India. Major course of studies include Jurisprudence, Theology and Islamic Literature.

About

It was founded in the year 1892 by Ayatullah Syed Muhammad Abul Hasan. The extensive madrasa buildings were erected under the supervision of the Nawab Mehdi Hasan Khan, a philanthropist of Awadh. The foundation stone was laid down in 1911 and the central hall was inaugurated by the then Lieutenant-Governor of the United Provinces of Agra and Oudh Sir John Prescott Hewett.
Sultanul Madaris is the second Shia religious school in Lucknow. The first one was Madrasatul Imamia - Which was closed down by the Britishers and the third being Jamia Nazmia.

Courses
The following courses are offered by the Madrasa:
Darjat Tahtaniya
Darjat Fokaania
Darjat-e-Aalia
Darj-e-Sannad-ul-Afazil (Duration 3 Years)
Darj-e-Sadar-ul-Afazil

The first two courses Darjat Tahtaniya and Darjat Fokaania consisting of seven Darjas (levels/stages) is the primary course.

Alumni
Major personalities who have received education from Sultanul Madaris include, but are not limited to:
 Moulana Molvi Iftikhar Hussain Ansari
 Ayatullah Sayyid Ali Naqi Naqvi
 Ayatullah Al-Udhma Syed Rahat Hussain Rizvi Gopalpuri
 Ayatullah Syed Mohsin Nawab Rizvi Mujtahid, 
 Maulana Syed Ibne Hasan Nonaharvi, Principal, Madrasatul Waizeen.
 Prof. Syed Shabihul Hasan Nonaharvi, Lucknow University., was professor and chairman of Urdu Department at Lucknow University,
 Ziya'ul Millat Maulana Mujtahid Syed Wasi Mohammad Abidi, Principal, Wasiqa Arabic College, Faizabad.
 Zafrulmillat Ayatollah Syed Zafarul Hasan, Principal, Jawadia Arabic College, Banaras.
 Maulana Hafiz Kifayat Hussain.
 Hujjatul Islam Hakeem Maulana Syed Mazahir Hussain Rizvi Kararvi, Former Leader of Friday Prayers, Sultanate of Mahmudabad, Sitapur, Awadh
 Baba-e-Mantiq Maulana Syed Abdul Hussain.
 Allama Syed Ali Haider ( Sahib e Nafse Rasool)
 Maulana Ibne Hasan Karbalai, Karachi.
 Prof. Saiyid Nurul Hasan, Former Governor of West Bengal.
 Prof. Syed Suleman Abbas Rizvi, B.H.U.
 "Aqa-e-Shariat" Maulana Syed Kalbe Abid.
 Maulana Syed Hasan Rizvi, Karbala-e-Moalla, Iraq.
 Maulana Molvi Iftikhar Hussain Ansari, President All Jammu & Kashmir Shia Association
 Maulana Murtuza Husain "Fazil Lakhnavi", Lahore.
 Dr. Syed Kalbe Sadiq
 Maulana Syed Litafat Hussain Gopalpuri
 Maulana Syed Hasan Naqvi, Lucknow
 Prof. Imran Raza Rizvi.
 Maulana Syed Mohammad Mehdi Zayadpuri.
 Maulana Muhammad Mustafa Jauhar, Adeeb, Karachi.
 Maulana Ariful Millat Mufti Syed Arif Husain Rizvi Mujtahid. Ex-Principal, Sultanul Madaris, Khairpur.
 Maulana Syed Muhammad Adil Rizvi (Rizvia Karachi)
 Maulana Syed Asad Raza Rizvi Gopalpuri
 Maulana Syed Mohammad, Ex-Principal, Sultanul Madaris.
 Maulana Syed Ali, Ex-Principal, Sultanul Madaris.
 Maulana Syed Hussain, Prof. Faqihat, Jamia Sultania.
 Maulana Syed Ali Hussain, Lecturer, Faqihat, Jamia Sultania.
 Maulana Altaf Haider, Lecturer, Faqihat, Jamia Sultania.
Ex Principal, Madarse Aliya (Oriental College), Rampur (UP); 
Ex Principal, Jamey Imaniya Nasirya, Jaunpur (UP);
Vice Principal, Sulatanul Madaris, Lucknow (UP)
 Khateeb-e-Akbar Allama Mirza Mohammed Athar  (Former Principal, Shia College, Lucknow)
 Maulana Syed Abu Iftikhar Zaidi, Imam-e-Juma, Burundi.
 Maulana Aalim Husain, Shair Arabi
 Maulana Khadem Husain
 Maulana Syed Riyaz Akbar Aabedi Barahvi, Mombasa
 Maulana Mohammad Hasan Maroofi, Imam-e-Juma, Hussaini Mission, Hounslow, London
 Molana Mohammad Jafar waiz Ansari, Bani Madars e Jafarul uloom, Muzaffarnagar, Uttar Pradesh

See also
 Tafazzul Husain Kashmiri
 Madrasatul Waizeen
 Jamia Nazmia
 Sultanul Madaris
 Tanzeem-ul-Makatib
Jamiya Imamia at Lucknow, UP. 
Jameatuz Zahra at Lucknow, UP. 
Madrasa Khadeejatul Kubra at Lucknow, UP. 
 Jamia Imania, Varanasi
 Jami'ul Uloom Jawadia, Varanasi
 Hoza-e-Ilmiya Wasiqa, Faizabad
 Babul Ilm, Mubarakpur, Azamgarh
 Jamia Haidariya, Khairabad Mau.

References

External links

 The official website of Sultanul Madaris

Education in Lucknow
Madrasas in India
Islam in India
1892 establishments in India
Educational institutions established in 1892